Fu Yiwei (born 26 May 1964) is a Chinese actress.

Fu is noted for her roles as Daji in the television series The Investiture of the Gods.

Fu has won the Best Actress at the 1st China Film Association, 1986 Xiaobaihua Award for Best Actress and Huading Award for Best Supporting Actress, she received Most Popular Actress Award nomination at the 19th Shanghai Television Festival.

Life
Fu was born Fu Yiwei in Harbin, Heilongjiang on May 26, 1964.

Personal life
Fu was twice married. Originally wed to Yang Xiaodan, an actor in Changchun Film Group Corporation.

After a turbulent divorce, she remarried in 1990, her second husband, Gao Du, is a teacher in Beijing Dance Academy, their son, Gao Yanan, was born in 1994 and they divorced in 2000.

On March 2, 2016, Beijing police reported Fu was arrested for allegedly sheltering drug users.

Filmography

Film

Television

Awards

References

External links

1964 births
Actresses from Harbin
Actresses from Heilongjiang
Living people
Chinese film actresses
Chinese television actresses